Nicole Elizabeth Eggert (born January 13, 1972) is an American actress. Her notable roles include Jamie Powell on the situation comedy Charles in Charge and Summer Quinn on the television series Baywatch. She guest-starred in The Super Mario Bros. Super Show! and Boy Meets World. She made several Christmas movies that premiered on Lifetime. Eggert was a 2010 contestant on the VH1 reality show Celebrity Fit Club and came in second in 2013 on ABC's celebrity diving show Splash.

Early life
Eggert was born in Glendale, California. Her mother, Gina Duncan, was a British-born talent agent, and her father, Rolf Eggert, was a German-born canning-company executive. Eggert's quest for stardom started when her mother entered her in beauty contests. At age five, Eggert was Miss Universe in the petite division. An agent saw her and offered her parents a role for her in a Johnson's baby shampoo commercial.

Career
In 1980, at age eight, Eggert landed a role in the movie Rich and Famous, opposite Jacqueline Bisset and Candice Bergen, playing Bergen's character's young daughter.

Also in 1980, Eggert provided the voice of Dennis's snobby archrival Margaret Wade in Dennis the Menace in Mayday for Mother, which was the first animated adaptation in the Dennis the Menace trilogy.

Eggert had a recurring role on Who's the Boss? from 1985 to 1986 as Marci Ferguson, a friend of Samantha Micelli (Alyssa Milano). In January 1987, she starred on the situation comedy Charles in Charge as Jamie Powell. In 1989, she hosted the Nickelodeon Kids' Choice Awards with Wil Wheaton. That same year, she was the first guest star to appear on The Super Mario Bros. Super Show!. She starred as Alexa Adams in the TV movie adaptation of Danielle Steel's Secrets, released in 1992. She was featured as one of the many lifeguards on seasons three and four on the syndicated series Baywatch. She appeared on the series from 1992 to 1994 and was originally supposed to be on a Baywatch spin-off (she returned to Baywatch for the reunion movie Baywatch: Hawaiian Wedding (2003)). She appeared on Married... with Children in an episode titled "Enemies" as Shannon (1996), intended to be a back-door pilot for a spin-off.

Eggert appears on the cover of rock band Sugar Ray's debut album, Lemonade and Brownies.

In 2004, Eggert played the role of Ginger in the first edition of the TBS network's The Real Gilligan's Island reality show. She appeared on Scott Baio Is 45...and Single (featuring her Charles in Charge co-star) in 2007.

On September 23, 2009, VH1 announced Eggert's participation in the winter 2010 season of Celebrity Fit Club.

In 2010, Eggert appeared on the Comedy Central Roast of David Hasselhoff.

In 2013, Eggert was added to the cast of Splash, the celebrity diving show on ABC. In April, it was reported she was injured during the taping of an episode. In the days following, she denied sustaining any serious injury.

In 2014, Eggert began a new career as the owner-operator of an ice-cream truck.

In 2019, she appeared on the 4th episode of Back in the Game.

Personal life
Eggert has two daughters. She was engaged to Canadian actor Corey Haim, with whom she starred in Blown Away (1992), The Double 0 Kid (1992) and Anything for Love (1993). She is credited with helping to save Haim's life at least once by taking him to the hospital to detox during a 'narcotic rush', although she has said: "I spent a lot of nights in emergency rooms with him. I don't think that I saved his life, I just think that I was there for him."

On April 21, 2015, she appeared on the television series Botched for a breast reduction.

Eggert has accused her former Charles In Charge co-star Scott Baio of sexually harassing and sexually abusing her as a minor, beginning at age 14. Baio has adamantly denied the claims. Baio has said that they engaged in a one-time consensual sexual encounter when Eggert was 18, which Eggert initiated. Eggert has said that she was 17, and that Baio initiated their encounter.

Filmography

Film

Television

Awards and nominations

References

External links

 
 
 

1972 births
Living people
Actresses from Los Angeles
American child actresses
American film actresses
American television actresses
Participants in American reality television series
20th-century American actresses
21st-century American actresses
Actresses from Glendale, California
American people of British descent
American people of German descent
Child beauty pageant contestants